Culshaw and Sumners was a firm of English architects and surveyors who practised in Liverpool in the 19th and early 20th centuries.  It was founded in the 1830s by William Culshaw (1807–74), who was joined by Henry Sumners (1825–95) in 1861.  Their partnership was dissolved in 1873 when Sumners was replaced by Culshaw's son, Alfred (1849/50–1926), who continued to run the practice until 1916. The practice carried out much mundane and routine work, but also designed new buildings, some of which are considered to be notable.  Their output included office blocks, warehouses, domestic properties, workhouses, churches, and a hospital.

This list includes the existing buildings of the architects that have been listed, and/or are included in the Buildings of England series.  The buildings designed by Culshaw alone are denoted by † in the "Name" column, those of Sumners by ‡, and the single work of William Culshaw & Son by ¶.

Key

Works

References

Bibliography

 

 

Culshaw and Sumners